David Allan Hoyda (May 20, 1957 – February 8, 2015) was a Canadian former professional ice hockey player. Hoyda played four seasons in the National Hockey League (NHL) with the Philadelphia Flyers and Winnipeg Jets.  He was known primarily as an enforcer.

Hoyda was raised in Cherhill, Alberta, and later attended St. Francis Xavier High School in Edmonton while he played Canadian Junior "A" hockey with the Spruce Grove Mets. Hoyda and the Mets won the 1975 Canadian Junior "A" national championship.  He moved up to Major Junior hockey for his next two seasons, playing with the Edmonton Oil Kings/Portland Winterhawks (franchise moved).

Hoyda was drafted in both the World Hockey Association and NHL Amateur Drafts in 1977, signing a contract with the NHL's Philadelphia Flyers.

Career statistics

Regular season and playoffs

References

External links
 

1957 births
2015 deaths
Canadian expatriate ice hockey players in the United States
Canadian ice hockey left wingers
Edmonton Mets players
Edmonton Oil Kings (WCHL) players
Edmonton Oilers (WHA) draft picks
Maine Mariners players
Philadelphia Flyers draft picks
Philadelphia Flyers players
Portland Winterhawks players
Ice hockey people from Edmonton
Spruce Grove Mets players
Tulsa Oilers (1964–1984) players
Winnipeg Jets (1979–1996) players